OLT Express Poland (ICOA: YAP) was a Polish charter airline, formally known as Yes Airways. On 31 July 2012 it suspended all charter services, less than a week after the scheduled sister airline OLT Express Regional cancelled all its services. Stranded customers were returned home on LOT services. All leased aircraft were repossessed by lessors, and even some wet lease pilots were released back to their employer airlines. Its sister airline, OLT Express Regional (ICOA: JEA), filed for bankruptcy on 27 July 2012 after its licence was suspended by the Polish Aviation Authority.

Yes Airways was founded in 2009 and was based in Warsaw. It began operations in late April 2011. It flew from regional airports in Poland on behalf of tour operators and was the first Polish airline to have Airbus aircraft in its fleet. In early 2012, YES Airlines was rebranded as OLT Express Poland by its new owners, Amber Gold, who also controlled OLT Express Germany and OLT Express Regional.  The airline's main hub was located at Warsaw Chopin Airport.

On 31 July 2012 OLT Express Poland followed its sister airline OLT Express Regional in suspending all services. All leased aircraft were returned to their owners. The third sister company, OLT Express Germany, announced they are seeking an external investor to support operations, and fund the earlier announced takeover of Contact Air.

OLT Express Regional - Scheduled services

OLT Express Regional began life in 2001 as Jet Air, an airline operating in the business aviation sector, providing broker rendering services (small aircraft and helicopters) to local operators and companies. Jet Air started scheduled domestic operation for LOT Polish Airlines in winter 2005/06 with three BAe Jetstream 32, flying on routes with less demand (like Zielona Góra, Bydgoszcz, and Rzeszów).

On 11 October 2007, LOT Polish Airlines announced it would cut the amount of routes Jet Air would fly, citing the lesser desirability of Jetstream aircraft as well as limited demand for the destinations served by Jet Air. In the end, this enabled Jet Air to begin its own operation as a stand-alone airline. Jet Air-branded flights began in late 2007 and since then the airline rapidly expanded the number of destinations it flew to. Starting from October 2010, Jet Air operated flights on behalf of Ostfriesische Lufttransport (OLT) from their hub at Bremen Airport to both Nuremberg Airport and Brussels Airport. These flights ceased in May 2011.

Amber Gold ownership
In February 2012, Jet Air, now called OLT Jetair, after being bought by the Amber Gold Group, restarted operations as OLT Express Regional. It began to utilise the larger jet aircraft of its new sister operator OLT Express Poland (previously known as Yes Airways, a Polish charter airline, whom Amber Gold bought 85% of shares) under the common brand OLT Express. Whilst both carriers technically retain their own operating certificates, they, along with OLT Express Germany, use a common marketing strategy, reservations system and sales structure. Despite this, OLT Express' operations are not integrated with those of OLT Express Germany and both airlines operate their own individual route networks. OLT Express Regional's inaugural flight from Warsaw Chopin Airport to Gdańsk Lech Wałęsa Airport took place on 1 April 2012.

The airline's scheduled international and domestic flights were operated under the IATA/ICAO airline codes O2/JEA, using aircraft drawn from the fleets of both OLT Express Regional and OLT Express Poland, whilst charter flights were operated solely by OLT Express Poland, under the ICAO code YAP, using their Airbus A319 and A320 aircraft.

Bankruptcy
On 25 July 2012, OLT announced it was undergoing a dramatic re-organisation. Amber Gold was not in a position to provide the funding needed to continue normal operation.

Under the re-organisation, all its ATR aircraft would be grounded. It says it intends to raise 8,000,000 PLN from their sale; however, other sources state some of the aircraft are leased from Swift Air. The load factor on these flights was 11% according to the airline; however, they claim an overall load factor of 75% in June 2012, including its Airbus aircraft. It will cancel 14 routes served by these aircraft and move some crews across to the new Airbus craft due in September. However, some will have to be laid off as they would need to be fully retrained to operate these new aircraft.

The CEO of OLT admitted the airline was running at a substantial loss, approximately 600,000 euros per month. Ticket prices are due to rise from an average of 155 PLN to 180 PLN, and the number of the cheapest fare tickets on each flight will be reduced. Unlike other low-fares airlines, OLT had provided free drinks and snacks on its flights. They will stop this practice after the re-organisation and only provide free water, still unheard of for low-fares airlines. They intend to start their own catering company and re-introduce free catering and drinks on flights at a later date.

Amber Gold claims to have invested roughly 52 million euro in the airline to date. The airline's credit card service providers, BZ WBK and Volkswagen Bank have decided to terminate their relationship with the airline after they failed to provide guarantees the banks requested in July 2012.

There was also a dispute with the Polish Aviation Authority as they have failed to submit financial reports for 2011. OLT Express claims they have submitted the reports but the PAA claim they have not. The PAA set a deadline of the end of July 2012 for the reports to be submitted, or their licence to fly might be suspended or revoked.

On 26 July, 24 hours after announcing that ATR services would continue until 10 August, OLT announced all services using ATR aircraft would cease immediately. Some domestic services using Airbus aircraft were also cancelled, casting major doubts over the airline's future. The Managing Director had said OLT would pay for passengers to fly with other airlines, and then reneged on this promise.

On 27 July, all flights were suspended without notice and ticket sales were stopped. The website featured a banner which translates as "Ladies and Gentlemen, please be advised that from 27 July, all regular flights are suspended until further notice. At the same time, the sale of airline tickets will be halted." The airline had been flying for less than four months at that point. The airline head, Jarosław Frankowski, claimed to be in advanced talks with another airline to sell the company entirely. After failing to find a buyer and with credit card companies demanding far bigger deposits, the airline had insufficient cash-flow to continue. On 27 July 2012, they filed for bankruptcy, less than four months after starting operations.

Amber Gold financial questions
The Chairman of Amber Gold, Marcin Plichta, is a former bankrupt and was also convicted of embezzling 174,000 PLN (approx. US$80,000) from ca. 400 customers of his previous business, Multikasa, in 2008. He was given a 10-month sentence, suspended for 2 years. After the conviction, he changed his name from Stefanski to Plichta. He was only 24 years of age at the time. His wife, Katarzyna Plichta is Chairperson of the Supervisory Board.
Amber Gold is not approved by the Financial Supervision Authority to operate as a financial institution, and the FSA has gone to court in relation to this. The FSA have also issued a public alert to make that clear to potential customers, many of whom have had to wait months to recover money in the past. Amber Gold has since claimed it is a business that trades in precious metals and simply enters into storage contracts with its customers. The company claims to have about 100 kg of gold in reserve to cover deposits. It transacts its business through brokers. Their claim to offer up to 13.9% guaranteed annual returns has come in for scrutiny. In late July 2012 clients again stated they had difficulty recovering their money from Amber Gold. It had taken the Polish FSA to court for issuing a public alert which Amber Gold says is affecting its reputation. 
Amber Gold announced their intention to exit the airline industry entirely after both OLT Express Regional and Poland cancelled all operations.

On 13 August 2012, Amber Gold was liquidated.

Destinations
List of all served, planned, and terminated flight destinations of OLT Express (until 31 July 2012 when it ceased all operations) and its airline predecessors: Jet Air (until 31 July 2011), OLT Jetair (until 23 March 2012) and Yes Airways.

Charter flights destinations

Destinations served by charter flights designated with the ICAO code YAP in the 2012 summer season.

Destinations served by Yes Airways 
Destinations served only prior to name change from Yes Airways to OLT Express.

Scheduled flights destinations
Destinations served by scheduled passenger flights designated with airline codes O2/JEA.

Destinations served by Jet Air and OLT Jetair
Destinations served by Jet Air (until 31 July 2011) and OLT Jetair (until 23 March 2012) but not offered by OLT Express. This list does not include destinations served solely by codeshare flights.

 Note
 A^ Only Wingo xprs or Fly Lappeenranta flights operated by Jet Air.

Fleet
The day OLT Express ceased operations, its fleet consisted of the following aircraft:

References

External links

Official website of OLT Express

Defunct airlines of Poland
Airlines established in 2011
Airlines disestablished in 2012
Polish companies established in 2011
2012 disestablishments in Poland
European Regions Airline Association
Polish Limited Liability Companies

de:OLT Express Regional